Ng (pronounced ; English approximation often  or ) is a Cantonese transliteration of the Chinese surnames 吳/吴 (Mandarin Wú) and 伍 (Mandarin Wǔ). Alternately, it is a common Hokkien transcription of the name 黃/黄 (Mandarin Huáng).

The surname is sometimes romanized as Ang, Eng, Ing and Ong in the United States and Ung in Australia. The Mandarin version of Ng is sometimes romanized as Woo or Wu, such as John Woo. In Vietnam, the corresponding surname is Ngô. In Cambodia, the corresponding surname is Oeng. 

Notable people with the surname Ng (character unknown)
Clive Ng (born 1962), media sector financier and executive
Elise Ng (born 1981), Hong Kong squash player
Evelyn Ng (born 1975), professional poker player from Canada
Fae Myenne Ng, writer living in New York City
Geeling Ng, New Zealand actress of "China Girl" fame
Jasmine Ng (born 1972), Singaporean film director
John Ng (born 1950), kung fu master, traditional Chinese medicine doctor, and pharmacist – now living in Kentucky, US
Jonathon Ng, Irish singer-songwriter known as EDEN
Josiah Ng (born 1980), Malaysian track cyclist
Kelvin Ng, politician in Canada who was elected in both the Nunavut Legislature and Northwest Territories Legislature
Konrad Ng, US President Barack Obama's brother-in-law and husband of Maya Soetoro-Ng
Kim Ng, general manager of the Miami Marlins, the first woman general manager in Major League Baseball
Lenhard Ng, Chinese American mathematician (ex-child prodigy)
Maya Soetoro-Ng (born 1970), Indonesian-born American writer, US President Obama's half-sister and wife to Konrad Ng
Perry Ng (born 1996), English footballer
Ng Poon Chew (1866–1931), author, publisher, and advocate for Chinese American civil rights
Ng Swee Hong (1935–2006), Malaysian Chinese businessman who founded Pacific Andes
Ng Tat Wai (born 1947), badminton player from Penang, Malaysia
Ng Yi-Sheng (born 1980), Singaporean writer
Ng Yong Li (born 1985), Malaysian professional racing cyclist
Ren Ng, founder and the chief executive officer of Californian start-ups Refocus Imaging, Inc and Lytro, Inc
Win Ng (1936–1991), Chinese-American sculptor, industrial designer and illustrator

Notable people with the surname Ng (吳)
Ng Mui, said to have been one of the legendary Five Elders – survivors of the destruction of the Shaolin Temple by the Qing Dynasty
Andrew Ng (born 1976), computer science professor at Stanford and founder of Coursera
 Antonio Ng (born 1957), currently a member in the Macau Legislative Assembly
Benjamin Ng and Wai Chiu "Tony" Ng, two of the men convicted of the 1983 Wah Mee Massacre in Seattle
Carl Ng (born 1976), Hong Kong actor and model
Charles Ng (born 1960), Hong Kong Chinese-American serial killer from California, US
Charles Wang Wai Ng, Hong Kong Chinese civil engineer and academic
Ng Ching-fai, GBS (born 1939), Professor of Chemistry and former President and Vice Chancellor of Hong Kong Baptist University
Deep Ng, Hong Kong singer-songwriter, musician, and actor
Dominic Ng, Chairman and CEO of East West Bank based in California, US
Dora Ng, Hong Kong film costume and make up designer
Elaine Ng Yi-Lei (born 1972), actress and Miss Asia 1990
Francis Ng Chun-Yu (born 1961), Hong Kong actor
Hiu Lui Ng, New Yorker who died in 2008 in the custody of United States Immigration and Customs Enforcement
James Ng (born 1990), better known as Kwan Gor, Hong Kong singer and actor
Jeannette Ng, Hong Kong-born British fantasy author
John Lone, played the lead role in The Last Emperor
Jinny Ng (born 1992), Hong Kong Cantopop artist
Kary Ng (born 1986), Hong Kong Cantopop artist
Lawrence Ng (born 1964), popular TV actor in Hong Kong
Ng Man Tat (1952–2021), veteran actor in the Hong Kong film industry
Margaret Ng (born 1948), politician, barrister, writer and columnist in Hong Kong
Melissa Ng (born 1972), semi-retired TV actress from Hong Kong
Ng Ming-yum (1955–1992), founder of United Democrats of Hong Kong (later called Democratic Party)
Ng On-yee (born 1990), World women's snooker champion
Richard Ng (born 1939), Hong Kong actor
Ron Ng, Hong Kong TVB actor and singer
Sandra Ng (born 1965), Hong Kong actress
Ng See Yuen, (born 1944) director of independent film companies in Hong Kong
Stephen Ng (born 1953), Hong Kong entrepreneur, Deputy Chairman and Managing Director of the Wharf (Holdings) Ltd
Ng Ting Yip (born 1960), Hong Kong actor
Stanley Ng (born 1960), Hong Kong urban councilor 
Ng Wai Chiu (born 1981), Hong Kong professional football player
Ng Wei (born 1981), male badminton player from Hong Kong
Yan Ng (born 1983), Hong Kong Cantopop singer and actress

Notable people with the surname Ng (伍)
(Ng) Wu Zixu, general and politician during the Spring and Autumn period, most generally credited by all branches of 伍 clans as the 'first ancestor'
Wu Tingfang, also known as Ng Choy, lawyer, diplomat and politician
Ng Poon Chew, author, publisher, and advocate for Chinese American civil rights
Adrienne Louise Clarkson, Hong Kong-born Canadian journalist and Governor General of Canada
Celeste Ng, writer
Chelsia Ng, singer and actor from Malaysia
Charles Ng (racer), Hong Kong-born touring car driver
Christine Ng, Hong Kong actress under contract to Hong Kong's Television Broadcast Limited
Edward Ng (1939–2018), mathematical scientist in the US Space Program
Katherine Ng (born 1974), Political Assistant to the Secretary for Financial Services & the Treasury of Hong Kong
Kim Ng, United States baseball executive
Kingsley Ng, new media artist
Kym Ng, Singaporean actress with MediaCorp
Mary Ng, Canadian politician serving as Minister of International Trade, Export Promotion, Small Business and Economic Development since 2018
Ng Boon Bee (born 1938), former Malaysian badminton player
Ng Phek Hoong Irene (born 1963), Singaporean Member of Parliament
Ng Yat Chung, Singapore's Chief of Defence Force from 2003 to 2007
Philip Ng (born 1977), Hong Kong actor and martial artist
Rita Ng, (born 1978), first Miss California winner of Asian descent

Notable people with the surname Ng (黄)
Allan Ng (born 1942), Singaporean businessman
Angie Ng (1968–2002), Singaporean murder victim and alleged maid abuser
Darren Ng, Australian basketball player
Elvin Ng (born 1980), actor who joined the Mediacorp stable in Singapore
Irene Ng (actress) (born 1974), Malaysian actress now living in New York City
Lina Ng, Singaporean JTEAM actress, formerly under MediaCorp and MediaWorks
Nigel Ng (born 1991), Malaysian-born comedian
Ng Eng Teng, sculptor in Singapore known for his figurative sculptures, many around Singapore
Ng Chee Khern, Chief of the Republic of Singapore Air Force (RSAF)
Ng Chee Yang (born 1989), Singaporean singer
Ng Eng Hen (born 1958), Minister of Manpower and Second Minister for Defence of the Republic of Singapore
Ng Joo Ngan (born 1947), Malaysian cyclist
Ng Moon Hing (born 1955), 4th Anglican Bishop of West Malaysia, since 2007
Ng Ser Miang (born 1949), sportsman, diplomat and businessman from Singapore
Ng Shin Yii (born 1989), Malaysian world class wushu athlete
Ng Teng Fong (born 1930), Singaporean real estate billionaire
Robert Ng (born 1952), Singaporean and Chairman of the Sino Group since 1981
Ng Tian Hann (born 1969), Malaysian movie director
Ng Woon Lam, member of National Watercolor Society NWS and American Watercolor Society
Ng Yen Yen, Malaysian politician and Minister of Tourism in the Malaysian Cabinet
Ng Yew-Kwang (born 1942), economist at Monash University
Darren Ng Wei Jie (1991–2010), murder victim in Singapore
Agnes Ng Siew Heok, or Agnes Ng, Singaporean murder victim of the Toa Payoh child murders in 1981
Ng Soo Hin, a Singaporean carpenter sentenced to death for murder
Ng Lee Kheng, one of the two victims of the 1990 Ng Soo Hin murders
Ng Tze Yong (born 2000), Malaysia national badminton player

See also
"Ana Ng" is an alternative rock song by the band They Might Be Giants
Huang (disambiguation)
Wong (disambiguation)
Wu (surname)

References

Chinese-language surnames
Multiple Chinese surnames
Cantonese-language surnames
Surnames of Malaysian origin